The Lake County Arts Council is the official arts council for Lake County, California, USA, founded in 1981. It runs under the California Arts Council (CAC).

The Lake County Arts Council runs the Main Street Gallery, a small gallery for visual arts with space for arts classes in Lakeport, Ca. This space is also used for the Lake County Arts Council's literary program, which hosts the county's Poetry Out Loud Program, recurring Writer's Circles, and more. In addition, the Lake County Arts Council has other events and programs including Art in Public Places, the Spring Dance Festival, and the Summer Youth Art Camp.

The Lake County Arts Council also owns and operates the Soper Reese Theatre, Lake County's only fixed seating theatre located in Lakeport, Ca. The Soper Reese Theatre is a live performance venue that shows live theatrical shows, dance, live music, and has a Classic Cinema showing twice a month.

References

External links
Lake County Arts Council website

Arts councils of California
Lake County, California
Arts organizations established in 1981
1981 establishments in California